Grief's Infernal Flower is the third album by American doom metal band Windhand. The album was released on September 18, 2015 via Relapse Records. It was named the 17th best album of 2015 by Consequence of Sound.

On the Billboard charts, Grief's Infernal Flower reached No. 7 on Heatseekers Albums, No. 4 on Vinyl Albums, No. 16 on Hard Rock Albums, No. 39 on Top Rock Albums, and No. 17 on Tastemakers. It is Windhand's best-charting release to date.

Track listing

Personnel
Dorthia Cottrell – vocals
Asechiah Bogdan – guitars
Garrett Morris – guitars
Parker Chandler – bass
Ryan Wolfe – drums

References

2015 albums
Windhand albums
Relapse Records albums
Albums produced by Jack Endino